The Adjutant General of North Dakota is the highest-ranking military official in the State of North Dakota and is subordinate to the Governor of North Dakota. The Adjutant General is a member of the Governor's Cabinet and advises the Governor on military and emergency management matters. The Adjutant General is in charge of the North Dakota Army National Guard, North Dakota Air National Guard, the North Dakota Department of Emergency Services (Homeland Security and State Radio), and the North Dakota Civil Air Patrol. The current Adjutant General of North Dakota is Major General Alan S. Dohrmann.

The Adjutant General is appointed by the Governor for the duration of his or her term in office or at the pleasure of his or her successor.

Adjutants General of Dakota Territory

Adjutants General of North Dakota

References 

Government of North Dakota
Adjutants general of the National Guard of the United States